Requa is an unincorporated community located in the town of Garfield, Jackson County, Wisconsin, United States.

The name Requa is supposedly derived from a place in Norway.

References

Unincorporated communities in Jackson County, Wisconsin
Unincorporated communities in Wisconsin